Barbara Davis Hyman (née Sherry) is an American author and pastor, the first child of film star Bette Davis (1908–1989).

Early life
Born May 1, 1947, in Santa Ana, California, she is the daughter of Davis and artist William Grant Sherry (1914–1995). As an infant, she appeared briefly in her mother's film Payment on Demand (1951). Subsequently adopted by actor Gary Merrill, Davis's fourth husband, she was credited as B. D. Merrill for a minor role in What Ever Happened to Baby Jane? (1962), as the neighbor's daughter.

Marriage
B. D. met Jeremy Hyman (b. 1933 in London), the British nephew of Seven Arts Productions owner Eliot Hyman, on a blind date for the film's showing at the Cannes Film Festival, in 1963, and the couple married when B. D. was age 16 and Jeremy was age 29. Her mother Bette Davis gave her consent and publicly supported their marriage. The couple remained married for over 50 years until Jeremy's death in November 2017. They have two sons, Ashley and Justin.

Books
Hyman wrote two books highly critical of her mother, My Mother's Keeper (1985) and Narrow Is the Way (1987). My Mother's Keeper brought Hyman considerable condemnation for the timing of its publication since Davis was in ill health after suffering a stroke during the book's publication process, even though writing of the book had been completed well before the stroke. My Mother's Keeper chronicled a difficult mother–daughter relationship and depicted scenes of her mother as an overbearing alcoholic. Several of Davis's friends commented that the depictions of events were inaccurate and others with first-hand knowledge vehemently disagreed with the allegations. In her 1987 memoirs This 'N That, Davis wrote a "letter" to her daughter in which she alleged inaccuracies in Hyman's book.

Mike Wallace rebroadcast a 60 Minutes interview he had filmed with Hyman a few years earlier in which she commended Davis on her skills as a mother when she (Hyman) was younger, and said that she had adopted many of Davis's principles in raising her own children. My Mother's Keeper was a best-seller; the second book, however, did not generate the same level of interest. Despite the acrimony of their divorce years earlier, Davis's former husband, Gary Merrill, defended Davis and claimed in an interview with CNN that B. D. was motivated by "cruelty and greed". B. D.'s brother through adoption, Michael Merrill, ended contact with B.D., and refused to speak to her again. Bette Davis disinherited B. D. and her grandchildren; her estate was instead divided between her adopted son Michael Merrill and her assistant Kathryn Sermak.

Ministry
A born-again Christian, Hyman is the head of her own ministry and pastor of her church in Charlottesville, Virginia. She has written three books which were published by her ministry: Oppressive Parents: How to Leave Them and Love Them (1992), The Church is Not the Bride (2000), The Rapture, the Tribulation, and Beyond (2002).

In popular culture
Kiernan Shipka portrays a young Hyman in the FX anthology television series Feud (2017), which chronicles the rivalry between her mother Bette Davis and Joan Crawford during the production of their 1962 film What Ever Happened to Baby Jane?

Nora Dunn played Hyman in a 1989 Saturday Night Live sketch, where she views her mother's (Jan Hooks) posthumous video will.

References

External links
 
 
 "She's got Bette Davis Eyes: B.D. Hyman goes from Mommie Dearest to Jesus Dearest"article from The Hook 

1947 births
Living people
20th-century American actresses
American child actresses
American Protestant ministers and clergy
Bette Davis
Converts to evangelical Christianity
People from Greater Los Angeles
Writers from California